Glyptolithodes cristatipes, also known as the Peruvian centolla, is a species of king crab, and the only species in the genus Glyptolithodes. The species was briefly placed in the related genus Rhinolithodes after its initial description, but was soon moved to its own genus.

Distribution
G. cristatipes is found off the Pacific coasts of South America, especially Chile and Peru, and extending as far northwards as Southern California, and as far south as 33° 35' S. The most closely related genera to Glyptolithodes all live in the Northern Hemisphere, suggesting that Glyptolithodes has migrated from its ancestral home to the Southern Hemisphere, where it is now most abundant.

Dimorphism
This species shows notable sexual dimorphism, with the males having a right cheliped which is larger than the left.

References

King crabs
Edible crustaceans
Crustaceans of the eastern Pacific Ocean
Western South American coastal fauna
Monotypic crustacean genera
Taxa named by Walter Faxon